Wayampipukú is a Tupian language, more specifically, a Northern Tupi–Guarani language. The language is very closely related to Wayampi.

References 

Tupi–Guarani languages
Languages of Brazil